The Cambridge Manuals in Archaeology form a book series published by Cambridge University Press in the field of archaeology.

Volumes

References

External links
 Cambridge Core

Cambridge University Press books
Archaeology books